Vicky Veronica Clement-Jones (née Yip; 23 December 1948 – 30 July 1987) was a Hong Kong-born English physician and medical researcher. Her own diagnosis with ovarian cancer led her to found the British Association for Cancer United Patients (BACUP) in 1984.

Biography
Vicky Veronica Yip was born in 1948 in Hong Kong to Teddy Yip, a Chinese businessman, and Susie Ho. In 1957, Yip and her four siblings moved with their mother to East Grinstead, West Sussex. She was educated at the Notre Dame Convent School in Lingfield, Surrey, and East Grinstead County Grammar School. She graduated from Girton College, Cambridge in 1971 with a first in medical science, archaeology and anthropology, and went on to study medicine at St Thomas's Hospital Medical School.

She married Timothy Clement-Jones in 1973 and graduated from St Thomas's with an MB BCh in 1974. After qualifying, she held house posts at St Thomas's and was eventually promoted to senior house physician in neurology and thoracic medicine. She was appointed a medical registrar at St Bartholomew's Hospital in 1976 and was awarded a bursary to research the opioid peptides involved in responses to pain. After designing a radioimmunoassay for one of these peptides, her findings were published in Nature.

Clement-Jones was diagnosed with ovarian cancer in 1982, at which point she said she "crossed the divide from doctor to patient". This led her to establish the British Association for Cancer United Patients (BACUP), an organisation to provide information, advice and emotional support to cancer patients. BACUP was registered as a charity in 1984 and later became the largest organisation of its kind in the United Kingdom.

On 26 June 1987 she made an extended appearance on the British television discussion programme After Dark, discussing "Killing With Care?". The following month - on 30 July - Clement-Jones died, aged 38, exactly five years from the day she was diagnosed with ovarian cancer.

References

1948 births
1987 deaths
20th-century English medical doctors
English medical researchers
English health activists
Hong Kong emigrants to England
Deaths from ovarian cancer
Deaths from cancer in England
Fellows of the Royal College of Physicians
Alumni of Girton College, Cambridge
British neurologists
Women neurologists
Women medical researchers
English women medical doctors
Founders of charities
Place of death missing
Spouses of life peers
20th-century women physicians
20th-century English women
20th-century English people